Dunant may refer to:
 Henry Dunant
 Olivier Dunant
 Dunant, a submarine communications cable connecting the US and France